Music to Scream To is the third soundtrack album by American singer Poppy, released on October 20, 2020, through Sumerian Records. It served as a soundtrack for the singer's graphic novel Poppy's Inferno, which was released on the same day. Music to Scream To is Poppy's first album to be fully composed and produced by herself.

Background
In January 2020, Poppy announced through her social medias the release of a sequel for her 2019's graphic novel Genesis 1, called Poppy's Inferno. The book would originally be released in July 2020, being accompanied by a new soundtrack album titled Music to Scream To. In an interview to Revolver, Poppy mentioned she and her fiancé at the time, Ghostemane, were working on the tracks for the soundtrack, which would be noise influenced. Due to the COVID-19 pandemic, the release date underwent several delays, until the book and the soundtrack were both released on October 20, 2020.

Critical reception

Sputnikmusic criticized the album's production, claiming Music to Scream To is a "gimmick", a "marketing ploy" and that "the tracks are just one soulless note after another". Paper noted that its "digital screeches, near-silent stretches and altered ambient noise offer the listener an opportunity for an improvisational shoutalong".

Track listing

References

2020 soundtrack albums
Book soundtracks
Ambient soundtracks
Poppy (entertainer) albums
Noise music albums by American artists
Sumerian Records albums
Albums postponed due to the COVID-19 pandemic